"Georgia Clay" is a song written by Josh Kelley, Charles Kelley and Clint Lagerberg. It was recorded by Josh Kelley and released in August 2010 as the first single and title track from his debut country album Georgia Clay.

Critical reception
Matt Bjorke of Roughstock gave the song four stars of five, calling it an "immediate, universal earworm that fans will love to hear on the radio." Dan Milliken, reviewing the song for Country Universe, gave it a C−, describing it as "the most generic sort of high school nostalgia." Daryl Addison of Great American Country reviewed the song favorably, saying that "Kelley’s slight southern drawl is completely at home here."

Chart performance
"Georgia Clay" debuted at number 50 on the U.S. Billboard Hot Country Songs chart for the week of September 4, 2010.

Year-end charts

References

2010 singles
Josh Kelley songs
MCA Nashville Records singles
Songs written by Charles Kelley
Music videos directed by Wes Edwards
Songs written by Josh Kelley
2010 songs